Paul Wardingham is an English-born Australian musician. Self-described as "instrumental cyber metal" his style can be categorized as a hybrid mix of rock, progressive metal with electronic elements. He is currently signed to Enigmatic Records

As of February 2018 Paul is endorsed by Kiesel Guitars.

Biography
Paul Wardingham was born in the UK where he learned guitar and became exposed to blues and jazz fusion. He currently resides in Launceston, Australia where he performed in "The Collins/Wardingham Project", a progressive metal fusion band. In 2006, the group released the album Interactive.

Paul later contributed guitar instrumentals for "Aeon Displacement" in the 2011 Mortuus Machina album by the Australian melodic death metal band Universum.

As of 2010, Paul has operated as a solo artist, releasing four albums as of October 2018: Assimilate Regenerate, The Human Affliction, Spiritual Machines and Electromancer

Assimilate Regenerate (2011)
Released in 2011, the instrumental concept album Assimilate Regenerate was inspired by "science fiction, future technology and the effect it has on society".

Sputnikmusic awarded the album a rating of 4.5, noting that the "album is extremely solid from beginning to end, and is definitely one of the best records of 2011 so far."

The Human Affliction (2015)

Released during July 2015, The Human Affliction is an instrumental cyber metal concept album, based on a story Wardingham wrote.

The album features guest solos by Per Nilsson (Scar Symmetry) on the track ‘Burning Chrome’, Stephan Forte (Adagio) on ‘Digital Apocalypse’ and Andy James (Wearing Scars) and Christian Muenzner (Necrophagist) on the a bonus track ‘Day Of The Droids.

Spiritual Machines (2016)

On 14 March 2016, it was announced on Wardingham's website that he had begun work on a third solo album titled Spiritual Machines. Spiritual Machines was released on 21 November 2016.

Electromancer (2018)

On 30 November 2017, Paul Wardingham revealed on his website the cover artwork, track listing and release date for his fourth self-produced solo album titled Electromancer set for release 12 March 2018 on Enigmatic Records.

Like Wardingham’s sophomore effort The Human Affliction, Electromancer is a concept album inspired by an original story set on Earth in the year 2217.

Electromancer features cover artwork by Light The Torch (ex-Devil You Know) and former All Shall Perish guitarist Francesco Artusato.

Electromancer was released 10 April 2018.

On 1 September 2018, Paul Wardingham announced on his website that recording had begun on a follow-up release to his cyber metal concept album Electromancer, titled "Electromancer:Corrupted".

Day Zero: Rise Of The Horde (2020)

On 30 June 2020, Paul Wardingham released his 5th solo album Day Zero : Rise Of The Horde. Described as a “Mad Max meets Resident Evil inspired futuristic thrash metal thriller”. The album is the first in a 2 part album series.

Equipment

Guitars 

 Kiesel Vader (VX7) 7 string
 Kiesel Vader (VX8) 8 String
 Kiesel Osiris (OX7) 7 string
 Ibanez RGD2127z with EMG 707 pickups
 Ibanez RG8 with EMG 808 Pickups

Amplification 

 Line 6 POD X3 Live 
 Engl Powerball

Other equipment 

 Jim Dunlop Guitar Picks & Strings
 Roland System 8 synthesizer
 Roland SE-02 synthesizer
 Korg MS2000 synthesizer
 Yamaha CS2x synthesizer
 Ensoniq ESQ-1 synthesizer

Discography

The Collins/Wardingham Project
2006: Interactive

Solo
2011: Assimilate Regenerate
2015: The Human Affliction
2016: Spiritual Machines
2018: Electromancer
2020: Day Zero I : Rise of the Horde

References

Australian heavy metal guitarists
Lead guitarists
Living people
People from Brisbane
Progressive metal guitarists
Seven-string guitarists
Year of birth missing (living people)